From The Depths is the debut full-length album from British progressive death metal band Karybdis. It was recorded in 2011 at Parlour Studios and mixed and mastered by Russ Russell. It was released in July 2012 digitally and in physical format on 21 November 2012.

Track listing

Personnel

 Rich O'Donnell – vocals
 Pierre Dujardin – guitar
 Harsha Dasari – guitar
 Jay Gladwin – bass
 Mitch McGugan – drums

References

2012 albums
Karybdis (band) albums